Frederick William Rudler FGS FRAI (8 July 1840 – 23 January 1915) was an English mineralogist, geologist, anthropologist, and natural scientist.

He was born 8 July 1840 in London. After education at the Regent Street Royal Polytechnic Institution, Rudler was appointed in 1861 an assistant curator at the Museum of Practical Geology in Jermyn Street, London and remained in that post until 1876. From 1876 to 1879 he was a lecturer at the University College of Wales at Aberystwyth. From 1879 until his retirement in 1902, he was the curator and librarian of the Museum of Practical Geology.

Rudler was elected a Fellow of the Geological Society in 1870 and received the Society's Lyell Medal in 1903. He was president in 1880 of the anthropological department of the British Association, in 1887–1889 of the Geologists' Association, and in 1898–1899 of the Royal Anthropological Institute. He contributed numerous articles to Ure's Dictionary of Arts, Manufactures, and Mines (1875), Thorpe's Dictionary of Applied Chemistry, Muir's Dictionary of Chemistry, the Encyclopædia Britannica (1911), and prestigious journals.

He died in Tatsfield, Surrey, on 23 January 1915.

Selected publications
with George G. Chisholm:

References

External links
 

1840 births
1915 deaths
Alumni of the Regent Street Polytechnic
English geologists
English mineralogists
British curators
Fellows of the Geological Society of London
Lyell Medal winners
Fellows of the Royal Anthropological Institute of Great Britain and Ireland
Presidents of the Royal Anthropological Institute of Great Britain and Ireland
Presidents of the Geologists' Association